Orsidis proletarius is a species of beetle in the family Cerambycidae. It was described by Francis Polkinghorne Pascoe in 1858. It is known from Sulawesi and Moluccas.

References

Lamiini
Beetles described in 1858